Zarechny Urban Okrug is the name of several municipal formations in Russia. The following administrative divisions are incorporated as such:
Town of Oblast Significance of Zarechny, Penza Oblast
Town of Zarechny, Sverdlovsk Oblast

See also
Zarechny (disambiguation)

References